Mountaintop Removal is a 2007 documentary film directed by Michael O'Connell.  The film explores how mountaintop removal mining in West Virginia has affected local communities. Filmed over a two-year period, Mountain Top Removal features community advocates, such as Ed Wiley, Larry Gibson, Julia Bonds, Maria Gunnoe, and Mountain Justice Summer volunteers, in their efforts to oppose the destruction of Southern Appalachia's natural landscape. The film includes commentary from Jeff Goodell, author of Big Coal: The Dirty Secret Behind America's Energy Future, geologists Dr. William Schlesinger and Dr. Peter Taft, and also Bill Raney, President of the West Virginia Coal Association. The film won the Reel Current Award  (presented by Al Gore) at the 2008 Nashville Film Festival. Mountaintop Removal also received a Jury award at the 2008 Wild and Scenic Film Festival, Audience award at the 2008 Woods Hole Film Festival and was screened at The Lincoln Center on Earth Day April 22, 2008. The film is currently being distributed nationwide on PBS through NETA. The film's soundtrack includes music by Jim Lauderdale, Donna the Buffalo, John Specker and Sarah Hawker.

See also
Burning the Future: Coal in America
 The Last Mountain

References

External links
Books, Articles, Movies, and Websites about Mountaintop Removal Coal Mining
 
, from Marsh Fork Elementary School (2007 archive copy)

2007 films
2007 in the environment
American documentary films
Mountaintop removal mining
Coal mining in the United States
Documentary films about coal in the United States
Environmental impact of mining
Mining in West Virginia
Documentary films about Appalachia
2007 documentary films
Works about the history of mining
2000s English-language films
2000s American films